Lulu and Jimi is a 2009 drama film directed by Oskar Roehler. It is about the relationship between Lulu, a rich German girl and Jimi, a black man, happened in the German 50's.

Plot 
Lulu, a well-off German girl, falls in love with Jimi, the owner of a bumper cars stall. The problem is that he is black and her family doesn't approve of him, especially her mother (Katrin Sass). Lulu doesn't want the ridiculous boy her mother has found for her. Lulu and Jimi will do anything to be finally together.

Cast 
Jennifer Decker as Lulu
Ray Fearon as Jimi
Katrin Sass as Gertrud, Lulu's mother
Rolf Zacher as Daddy Cool and Lulu's father
Udo Kier as Schulz, the chofer
Bastian Pastewka as Ernst
Ulrich Thomsen as Harry Hass
Alexander Meyer as Lulu's brother
Hans Michael Rehberg as Von Oppeln

Music 
Ray Fearon performs "Stand by me", the principal song in the movie.

Festivals 
It was projected in the Sundance Festival and in the Gijón Film Festival.

External links
 

2009 films
2009 romantic drama films
2000s English-language films
2000s German-language films
Films set in the 1950s
Films about interracial romance
Films directed by Oskar Roehler
Films scored by Martin Todsharow
Films set in West Germany
2009 multilingual films
French multilingual films
German multilingual films
2000s German films